Cholet Pays de Loire Dames was a women's one day cycle race which took place in Cholet, France between 2004 and 2015.

Winners

References

 
Cycle races in France
Recurring sporting events established in 2004
2004 establishments in France
Recurring sporting events disestablished in 2015
2015 disestablishments in France